Beverley Owen (née Ogg; May 13, 1937 – February 21, 2019) was an American television actress, best known for having played the original role of Marilyn Munster on the sitcom The Munsters before the role was taken over by Pat Priest.

Early life
Beverley Jane Ogg was born on May 13, 1937, in Ottumwa, Iowa. She was the first born child of Wallace E. Ogg and Charlotte M. Vander Ploeg. She grew up in Ames, Iowa, where her father was a professor of agricultural economics  at Iowa State University.  Her mother died in 1953.

Career 
In 1956, Owen appeared in her first TV role in As the World Turns. Owen appeared on the shows The Doctors, Kraft Mystery Theatre, The Virginian, Wagon Train, and Another World, and in the 1964 feature film Bullet for a Badman, starring Audie Murphy, after which she got the role of Marilyn Munster on The Munsters. In 1972, she played Dr. Paula McCrea for nine months in the soap opera Another World.

Personal life
Owen left The Munsters after 13 episodes to marry future Sesame Street writer and producer Jon Stone in Newfane, Vermont, on June 27, 1964. They were married for 10 years until 1974. She had two daughters, Polly and Kate. After her divorce in 1974, she continued to pursue her studies in early American history and earned a master's degree in 1989.

Death

Owen's daughter Polly confirmed that the actress died of ovarian cancer on February 21, 2019, at the age of 81. Butch Patrick, her co-star on The Munsters, released a Facebook statement on February 24, 2019, stating, "Beautiful Beverly Owen has left us. What a sweet soul. I had the biggest crush on her. RIP Bev and thanks for your 13 memorable Marilyn Munster episodes."

Selected filmography
 As the World Turns 
 The Doctors
 Bullet for a Badman
 Wagon Train
 The Virginian
 Another World
 The Munsters  originated the role of Marilyn Munster

References

External links

1937 births
2019 deaths
20th-century American actresses
21st-century American actresses
Actresses from Iowa
American television actresses
People from Ottumwa, Iowa
University of Michigan alumni
Deaths from ovarian cancer
Deaths from cancer in Vermont